Nonni may refer to:

 Nonni river, an alternate name for Nen River in Northeast China
 Nonni, nickname of Icelandic children's author Jón Sveinsson
 Nonni, Italian word meaning grandfathers or grandparents
Ottaviano Nonni (1536-1606), Italian painter

See also
 Nonni and Manni, a 1988-1989 West German-Icelandic children's TV series